Thakurbaba Municipality is a municipality in Bardiya District in Lumbini Province of south-western Nepal. At the time of the 2011 Nepal census it had a population of 38,501 and had 8000 houses in the town.

References

Populated places in Bardiya District